The Indiana Library Federation (ILF) is a professional organization for Indiana's librarians, library workers, and trustees. It is headquartered in Indianapolis, Indiana. The ILF was created as a result of the Indiana Library Association (501(c)(6) being merged into the Indiana Library Trustee Association (501(c)(3) in 1990. The two organizations often had conferences together and merged to take advantage of ILTA's tax-exempt status.

Indiana Library Association
The Indiana Library Association was formed as the Library Association of Indiana in 1891. The organization's name was changed to the Indiana Library Association in 1897. E. M. Thomson was the association's first president.

Indiana Library Trustee Association
The Indiana Library Trustee Association is an association for public library board members, within the Indiana Library Federation. The organization started holding regular meetings in 1908.

Federation
ILF is made up of four affiliates.
 Indiana Public Library Association (IPLA)
 Association of Indiana School Library Educators (AISLE)
 Indiana Academic Library Association (IALA)
 Indiana Library Trustee and Supporter Association (ILSTA)

References

External links
 Indiana Library Federation website

Library associations in the United States
Organizations based in Indiana